Therma or Thermē was a Greek city founded by Eretrians or Corinthians in late 7th century BC in ancient Mygdonia (which was later incorporated into Macedon), situated at the northeastern extremity of a great gulf of the Aegean Sea, the Thermaic Gulf. The city was built amidst mosquito-infested swampland, and its name derives from the Greek thérmē/thérma, "(malarial) fever".  Therma was later renamed Thessalonica by Cassander.  By that time the port of the previous capital of Macedonia, Pella, had begun silting up, so Cassander took advantage of the deep-water port to the northwest of Therma to expand the settlement.

The site of Therma is tentatively located 3 miles (5 km) south of modern Thessaloniki around the suburb of modern Thermi.

See also
List of ancient Greek cities

References

Herodotus, the Seventh, Eighth, & Ninth Books, with Introduction  Reginald Walter Macan
The Letters to the Thessalonians  by Gene L. Green
From Mycenae to Constantinople: The Evolution of the Ancient City  By Richard Allan Tomlinson
Hidryma Meletōn Chersonēsou tou Haimou (Thessalonikē, Greece)

External links
Ancient coinage from Therma

Cities in ancient Macedonia
Greek colonies in Mygdonia
Ancient Thessalonica
Populated places established in the 7th century BC
Former populated places in Greece
Populated places in ancient Macedonia
Eretrian colonies
Corinthian colonies